The 2007 Zhani-Vedeno ambush occurred on 7 October when a convoy of vehicles carrying local Russian interior ministry soldiers and policemen was ambushed in the volatile Vedeno region of Chechnya. The ambush resulted in the deaths of at least four soldiers and the hospitalisation of 10 to 16. It was carried out under the command of Amir Aslambek, and was one of the deadliest attacks in several months.

According to an article by Kommersant, the convoy of a dozen armored military trucks and armored personnel carriers carrying detachments of local police officers and servicemen from the Akhmad Kadyrov Patrol Police Regiment-2 and the South (Yug) Battalion of Internal Troops (both composed of Kadyrovtsy) was reinforcing forces involved in the clearance operation in the village of Dargo, a bastion of the resistance to Russian rule for 300 years.

According to the separatist website Chechenpress, the ambush and subsequent fighting resulted in the deaths of 25 soldiers (10 to 16 from the ambush) and one rebel. The Russian sources also said a body of fighter was found in Dargo.

References

External links
 Convoy Ambushed in Vedeno The Jamestown Foundation, October 11, 2007
 4 Dead, 10 Injured in Chechen Ambush The Moscow Times, October 9, 2007
 Four Killed, At Least 10 Wounded in Chechnya Attack Voice of America, 8 October 2007

21st-century mass murder in Russia
Ambushes
Battles of the Second Chechen War
Battles involving Chechnya
October 2007 events in Russia
Operations of the Second Chechen War
Terrorist incidents in Russia in 2007